A Garibaldian in the Convent (Italian: Un garibaldino al convento) is a 1942 Italian historical comedy drama romantic film directed by Vittorio De Sica and starring Leonardo Cortese, María Mercader and Carla Del Poggio. It is considered the work with which De Sica concludes the series of light comedies largely set in colleges and institutions for young girls and period costumes to enter into films of more contemporary and popular settings that will result in post-war neorealistic works. It was screened in November 1991 as part of a retrospective of De Sica's films at the Museum of Modern Art. It was shot at the Palatino Studios in Rome. The film's sets were designed by the art director Veniero Colasanti.

Plot
In the early years of the 20th century, a grandmother tells the story of a picture to her grandchildren of how many years before, in 1860, she and her rival María Mercader as Mariella Dominiani, were both students of the convent of Santa Rossana.  But their lives change when a wounded Garibaldi soldier, Count Amidei is hid on the grounds by the custodian of the convent, Tiepolo.  Mariella, who knows the soldier and is engaged with him, cares for him.  But the soldier is discovered and the nuns report him to opposing soldiers, who come for him. Tiepolo, and Mariella desperately try to stop them and barricade themselves with the soldier. Here, young Carla Del Poggio as Caterinetta Bellelli jumps on a horse and is chased by the soldiers. But she reaches Garibaldi's lines and with the help of Vittorio De Sica as Nino Bixio leads then back to the convent, and gets Count Amidei back to friendly lines. However, he later dies in battle.

As the grandmother, (who is Caterinetta) finishes the story, her friend Mariella arrives, who has never married, and the granddaughters, look on understanding now.

Cast

 Leonardo Cortese as Il conte Franco Amidei
 María Mercader as Mariella Dominiani 
 Carla Del Poggio as Caterinetta Bellelli
 Fausto Guerzoni as Tiepolo, Il guardiano del convento
 Elvira Betrone as La madre superiora
 Clara Auteri Pepe as Geltrude Corbetti
 Dina Romano as Suor Ignazia
 Olga Vittoria Gentilli as La marchesa Dominiani
 Federico Collino as Giacinto Bellelli
 Armando Migliari as Raimondo Bellelli
 Lamberto Picasso as Giovanni Bellelli
 Vittorio De Sica as Nino Bixio
 Achille Majeroni as Il governatore
 Miguel del Castillo as Il capitano borbonico 
 Evelina Paoli as Mariella anziana 
 Adele Mosso as Caterinetta anziana 
 Gilda Marchiò as La suora insegnante di musica 
 Virginia Pasquali as Geltrude anziana 
 Licia D'Alba as La prima nipote di Caterinetta 
 Tatiana Farnese as La seconda nipote di Caterinetta

References

External links

1942 films
1940s historical comedy-drama films
1940s historical romance films
Italian historical comedy-drama films
Italian historical romance films
Italian romantic comedy-drama films
1940s Italian-language films
Italian black-and-white films
Films directed by Vittorio De Sica
Films set in the 19th century
Films scored by Renzo Rossellini
Films shot at Palatino Studios
1940s Italian films